Baraka bint Thaʿlaba, commonly known by her kunya Umm Ayman, was an early Muslim and companion of the Islamic prophet Muhammad. 

She was an Abyssinian slave of Muhammad's parents, Abdullah ibn Abdul-Muttalib and  Aminah bint Wahb. Following the death of Aminah, Baraka helped to raise Muhammad in the household of his grandfather, Abdul-Muttalib ibn Hashim. He saw her as a mother figure. Muhammad later freed her from slavery, but she continued to serve Muhammad and his family. She was an early convert to Islam, and was present at the important battles of Uhud and Khaybar.

Following her freedom Muhammad also arranged her marriages, first to Ubayd ibn Zayd of the Banu Khazraj, with whom she had a son, Ayman ibn Ubayd, giving her the kunya Umm Ayman (meaning mother of Ayman). She was later married to the adopted son of Muhammad, Zayd ibn Harithah. Her son with Zayd, Usama ibn Zayd, served as a commander in the early Muslim army and led the Expedition of Usama bin Zayd into the Byzantine Empire.

Background 
Baraka was the daughter of Tha'laba bin Amr, an Abyssinian. She served as a slave in the household of Abdullah ibn Abdul-Muttalib and  Aminah bint Wahb. She became Muhammad's slave, after the death of Aminah.

Muhammad's childhood 
Following Aminah's death in Al-Abwa, Baraka looked after Muhammad, and moved with him to the household of his grandfather Abdul-Muttalib ibn Hashim in Mecca, where she served him during his childhood  and afterwards, in his adulthood.  

According to Ibn Kathir, Abdul-Muttalib ibn Hashim, Muhammad's paternal grandfather, had told Baraka not to neglect his grandson, especially as many of the Ahl al-Kiṫâb (People of the Book) predicted that he would be a prophet of the nation.

Marriages and children 
When Muhammad married Khadija, he arranged for Baraka's freedom and marriage to a Khazrajite companion named Ubayd ibn Zayd. Through this marriage, Baraka bore a son named Ayman, and thus she was known as "Umm Ayman" ("Mother of Ayman"). Ubayd was killed fighting in the Battle of Khaybar. Ayman ibn Ubayd was later killed fighting in the Battle of Hunayn.
 
Muhammad's adopted son Zayd ibn Harithah later married Baraka. They had a son named Usama who appointed as an army leader by Muhammad and led the successful Expedition of Usama bin Zayd into the Byzantine Empire.

Migration 
After Muhammad declared his Prophethood, Umm Ayman became one of his first followers. Later, she migrated to Medina.

Participation in battles 

Umm Ayman was present at the Battle of Uhud. She fetched water for the soldiers and helped treat the injured. She also accompanied Muhammad in the Battle of Khaybar.

In the battle of Uhud, many men ran away toward Medina after rumor of the death of Muhammad. Umm Ayman sprinkled dust on the face of some fugitives, gave them a spindle and told them: "give me your sword and [you] spin spindle." Then she went toward the battlefield along with several women. Subsequently, she was injured by an arrow which Hebban bin Araqa, an enemy soldier, shot at her.

Relationships with other early Muslims 
Muhammad was fond of Umm Ayman, even thinking of her as like a mother. Several hadiths describe Muhammad's esteem for her. He visited Umm Ayman at her house, and after him, Caliphs Abu Bakr and Umar did the same. In some hadith sources there is a heaven about the virtues of Umm Ayman. She is also praised in Shi'ite sources.

A few hadith have been narrated from her. Those such as Anas ibn Malik, Abu Yazid Madani and Hanash bin Abdullah San'any have narrated from her.

Death 
The exact date of Umm Ayman's death is not clear. Some have suggested that she died approximately five months after Muhammad's death. But according to ibn Sa'd, she was alive in the early days of the caliphate of Uthman.

See also 
 Bilal ibn Rabah
 Sahabah

References

Bibliography 
 
 
 
 
 
 
 
  
 
 
 
 
 
 
 
 
 
 

Women companions of the Prophet
Non-Arab companions of the Prophet
Arabian slaves and freedmen